SUW 2000 is a Polish variable gauge system that allows trains to cross a break of gauge. It is interoperable with the German Rafil Type V system (built by the Radsatzfabrik Ilsenburg).

History
The SUW 2000 system was designed by Ryszard Suwalski. Suwalski, of PKP Cargo, developed the system between 1990 and 1992. Prototype wheelsets, bogies for passenger carriages and goods wagons, and gauge changer were produced in 1993. The wheelsets were manufactured by ZNTK Poznań.

In October 2000 first regular passenger and freight trains started running between Poland and Lithuania.

In June 2003 regular passenger trains started running between Poland and Ukraine.

In 2008 SUW 2000 II, a development of the original SUW 2000, was presented. It introduced new bogie, improved gauge changer that is expected to last 20% longer, and electronic system checking and registering regauging and wheelset locking.

In 2019 PKP acquired documentation and rights to the SUW 2000 patents and technology. The system, renamed Polsuw, will be further developed in cooperation with Poznań University of Technology, one of the areas of work being the reduction of operating costs.

Operation
The SUW 2000 wheelsets feature unlockable wheels that, after unlocking, can move along the axles. The wheels on each side are moved sequentially—only after a wheel on one side has been moved to new gauge and locked, the opposite wheel is unlocked and begins moving. Originally the system did not have any control equipment to check if the regauging process went right, it relied on the personnel conducting visual checks on each wheelset. In 2003 an electronic system to monitor the regauging process and signal any malfunction was developed.

During initial regular operation, after , excessive wear to monoblock wheels was noticed, it was attributed to brake malfunctions; there was also some tearing of rubber sheaths due to friction between them and water draining pipes.

The introduction of SUW 2000 gauge changing facility at the Polish-Ukrainian border reduced the total travel time by 2 hours.

For a 32-wagon goods train it takes about 12 hours to cross the break of gauge using the bogie exchange facility. A transshipment involving unloading goods from one train and loading them onto another takes about 22 hours. If SUW 2000 II was deployed, the time taken for the crossing would be reduced to 4 hours.

Manufacture
The following SUW 2000 wheelsets and bogies were offered:

Between 1999 and 2009 ZNTK Poznań manufactured altogether 16 wheelsets for freight wagons and 68 wheelsets for passenger carriages. These were supplied to PKP Cargo (for 4 goods wagons), and PKP Intercity and UZ (for 10 and 5 passenger carriages, respectively, the remaining 8 being spares). They were used on passenger trains Balti (Warsaw – Vilnius, running October 1999–May 2005) and Chełmoński (Kraków – Kiyv, running from December 2003 until 2006, from 2009 until November 2016 to Lviv) and on a goods train between Mielec / Szczecinek (Poland) and Kazlų Rūda (Lithuania), running until 2009).

, a single SUW 2000 bogie cost the equivalent of $42,000.

Deployment
SUW 2000 gauge changing facilities are installed at the following locations:
 – 
   Mockava, Lithuania (dismantled in August 2013 during the rebuilding of the station, restored in or around 2016)
   Dorohusk, Poland
   Mostyska, Ukraine

A gauge changing facility was also planned at Brest, Belarus

  ZNTK Piła (research and testing)
  ZNTK Poznań (research and testing)
   (research and testing, can also be used as a link between the Broad Gauge Metallurgy Line and the standard-gauge PKP PLK network)

The construction of a standard-gauge railway line from the border to Kaunas railway station and intermodal freight terminal (part of Rail Baltica) made it possible to cross the Polish-Lithuanian border using standard-gauge rolling stock.

Incidents
At the end of 2006, on a train from Kraków to Kyiv, after going through the gauge changing facility, one of the wheel locks failed to engage. After about  running with an unlocked wheel, the carriage derailed. The Ukrainian authorities subsequently withdrew the certificate for SUW 2000-equipped rolling stock. After the introduction of additional safety system and a round of intergovernmental negotiations, SUW 2000-equipped rolling stock was again permitted to use Ukrainian railway network.

See also 
 Trans-Asian Railway

References

External links 
  (in Polish)
  (in Polish)

International rail transport
Track gauges